William Short (1759–1849) was an American diplomat during the early years of the United States. He served as Thomas Jefferson's private secretary when the latter was a peace commissioner in France, and remained in Europe to take on several other diplomatic posts. Jefferson, later the third President of the United States, was a lifelong mentor and friend. In a 1789 letter, Jefferson referred to Short as his "adoptive son."

Short was an early member and president (1778–1781) of Phi Beta Kappa at the College of William & Mary and was elected to Virginia's Executive Council from 1783 to 1784. After serving as the U.S.'s chargé d'affaires in France during the French Revolution (1789–92). In 1792 he was appointed as America's Minister to the Netherlands, and from 1794 to 1795 he served as a treaty commissioner to Spain. In 1804, Short was elected a member of the American Philosophical Society. Although his diplomatic career was not as celebrated or long as Short may have wished, and his love affair with a French noblewoman ended with her marrying another man, Short was a successful businessman and an opponent of slavery who died very wealthy in America.

Life
William Short was born in 1759 to William Short (the Fifth) and Elizabeth Skipwith at Spring Grove, Surry County, Virginia. He was the brother of Peyton Short, who became a land speculator and politician in Kentucky.

During his time in Paris as Thomas Jefferson's private secretary, William Short served as charge d'affaires in Jefferson's absence. Short's appointment to this role was President Washington's first appointment under the new Constitution, and thus Short holds the honor of being the first Presidential nominee in U.S. history. After Jefferson returned to America in 1789, Short continued as charge d'affairs, and since he was the highest ranking American diplomat in France he essentially served as the replacement U.S. Minister for three years. During this time, in what would become a lifelong correspondence, Short provided Jefferson with detailed reports on the progress of the French Revolution. After 1792, Short became increasingly disillusioned with the excessive violence of the Revolution, which resulted in several friends being arrested or murdered.

From September 1790 until August 1794, Short also acted as the United States's fiscal agent in Europe, and in that capacity he refinanced America's foreign debt, negotiating a lower interest rate than any other country enjoyed—a service that greatly helped America's federal government in the 1790s. He was appointed Minister Resident to the Netherlands in January 1792 and served until December 1792. From 1794 to 1795 he was a treaty commissioner plenipotentiary to Spain. Short's Spanish mission was frustrating, however, because France and Spain went to war in March 1793, making any Spanish-American treaty much more difficult. After working on negotiations for years, he was removed from his position just as the situation began to get better, and so did not get credit when a treaty was finally made. Short returned to Paris, but after finding that the woman he loved, the Duchesse Rosalie de la Rochefoucauld, was not willing to leave France, he went back to the United States to take care of business matters in 1802. Immediately upon returning, Short visited Jefferson for a month at Monticello, Jefferson's home.

A few years later, then-President Jefferson nominated Short via recess appointment to become Minister to Russia in 1808; however, after Short had arrived in Europe, the Senate decided not to have a diplomat sent to Russia at all, and Short never proceeded to the post. Short became angry at James Madison, who had succeeded Jefferson to the presidency, for not renewing his appointment and for sending John Quincy Adams instead in 1809. Short also found out that Rosalie not only would not leave France to marry him, but had actually married an older, wealthy relative instead. Short left Europe for good, returning to America and spending the last years of his life managing his successful business dealings, supporting various philanthropic ventures, and keeping up his friendship with Jefferson through visits and letters.

Short was both an opponent of slavery and a believer in the natural equality of the races. In 1798, he wrote that further research into the societies of Africa were giving evidence that black people were capable of great civilizations, and—he hoped—news of this would undermine the racial prejudices many white people in America held toward black people. He advocated freeing slaves in America, giving them farmland and access to education, and supported racial intermarriage. Later in his life, he became a supporter of the American Colonization Society, believing that slaveowners would be encouraged by it to free their slaves.

Love letters and romance with Rosalie de la Rochefoucauld
Short never acquired the fame or political prestige he sought in life, despite his charm and intellect, his diplomatic assignments in Europe, or his close relationship with Thomas Jefferson, whom he considered a second father. But Short developed an extraordinary romance with Alexandrine Charlotte de Rohan-Chabot, casually known as Rosalie, the Duchess de la Rochefoucauld. She was passionate and beautiful, a woman of the aristocracy during the French Revolution. She witnessed firsthand the violence during the Reign of Terror, including the assassination of her husband and the execution of her brother. Their love affair was recorded in hundreds of letters which detailed these events, documenting the lovers' pains of separation and their frustration with social norms. Their words of devotion are poetic and moving, and offer personal insights into a turbulent era of world history. Despite their romance, she eventually married a kinsman, Boniface Louis Andre, Marquis de Castellane, in 1810.

In popular culture
In the historical novel America's First Daughter, Short is a major character. The authors imagine him as having a lifelong unfulfilled romance with Jefferson's daughter Patsy.

References

Attribution

External links

 Portrait of William Short by Rembrandt Peale

1759 births
1849 deaths
Thomas Jefferson
College of William & Mary alumni
Ambassadors of the United States to Spain
Ambassadors of the United States to the Netherlands
Ambassadors of the United States to France
Phi Beta Kappa founders
18th-century American diplomats